New Formations: A Journal of Culture, Theory & Politics is a triannual peer-reviewed academic journal which covers the uses of cultural theory for the analysis of political and social issues. It is published by Lawrence and Wishart and the editor-in-chief is Jeremy Gilbert (University of East London).

Abstracting and indexing 
The journal is abstracted and indexed in:

References

External links 
 

English-language journals
Cultural journals
Publications established in 1993
Triannual journals
Socialist publications